Ardabil Khanate was an 18th-19th century khanate based in Ardabil. It was established by Badr Khan in 1736, who attended the coronation of Nader Shah in January 1736. The khanate was ruled by Sarikhanbayli clan of Shahsevan tribal alliance. It was disestablished in 1808 and converted to a province of Qajar Iran.

List of rulers 
 Badr Khan Sarikhanbayli-Shahsevan (as paramount chief of Shahsevans) 1736 - 1747
 Nazarali Khan Sarikhanbayli-Shahsevan 1757 - 1792 (acknowledged as khan by Karim Khan Zand)
 Tala Hassan Khan (ruled as puppet of Fatali Khan of Quba in 1784-1785)
 Nasir Khan Sarikhanbayli-Shahsevan 1792 - 1797
 Nazarali Khan II 1797-1808

References

Sources 
 
 

 
Ardabil
Vassal and tributary states of the Zand dynasty